Jüri Voiman (22 May 1896 Vaimastvere Parish (now Jõgeva Parish), Kreis Dorpat – 26 May 1942 Kirov, Russian SFSR) was an Estonian politician. He was a member of II Riigikogu.

References

1896 births
1942 deaths
People from Jõgeva Parish
People from Kreis Dorpat
Estonian Social Democratic Workers' Party politicians
Estonian Socialist Workers' Party politicians
Members of the Riigikogu, 1923–1926
Members of the Riigikogu, 1926–1929
Members of the Riigikogu, 1929–1932
Members of the Riigikogu, 1932–1934
Estonian people who died in Soviet detention
People who died in the Gulag